History of the Jews in Łódź began at the end of the 18th century when the first Jews arrived to the city. The community grew and became one of the largest Jewish communities in Europe. During the Holocaust the Jewish population of the city was concentrated in the northern-district of the city, Baluty, where a Nazi ghetto was established. The community numbers a few hundreds and is headquartered at the Karol Gebhardt House located in 18 Pomorska Street in the city.

History

The beginnings of Jewish settlement in Łódź date back to the 18th century, the period of the fall of the Polish-Lithuanian Commonwealth. The city did not have the de non tolerandis Judaeis privilege. The first known Jewish inhabitants of the city were Daniel Layzerowicz, a baker and Abram Lewkowicz, a tailor. They both lived in Łódź already in 1785. In 1791 Mosiek aka Mojżesz Pryntz from Lutomiersk settled here. The first wealthy and learned Jews living in Łódź were: Pinkus Zajdler, who came from Przedbórz in 1795, Pinkus Sonenberg, who came in 1797 from Łęczyca, and Lewek Heber, who came to Łódź in 1801 from Lutomiersk. They all played an important role, performing the functions of successive members of the Jewish community.

The influx of Jewish people to the town was not large until the Second Partition of Poland in 1793. Out of a total of 190 inhabitants, only 11 were Jews. It was undoubtedly influenced by the character of the city; it was still the so-called a typical agricultural village, not very attractive to newcomers. The fact that Łódź was the property of the bishop until the Second Partition of Poland was also of great importance for the Jewish settlement; only in the period 1796–1798 it became a government city.

In the years 1818-1817 the Jews of Lodz constituted about a third of the city's inhabitants and most of them were poor. In 1825, German experts were invited to Łódź to help industrialize the city. The Germans signed a treaty called the "Zagirez Treaty" which included restrictions on the Jews. The Jews were required to live in the southern edges of the city, and move to the Jewish quarter within two years, except for two families who received permission to live in another part of the city. This area covered the southern side of the Old Market Square, Wolborska and Podrzeczna Streets up to the Łódka River. The area of the Jewish district was expanded several times: in 1841, the entire Old Town Square was included, Wolborska, Podrzeczna, and Drewnowska Streets, and in 1861, it was extended to the southern and western parts of Kościelny Square, Franciszkańska and Północna Streets.

Although this ban only applied to Zgierz, the authorities by establishing factory settlements: Nowe Miasto and Łódka, they followed suit on the Agreement of Zgierz, therefore settling here handicraftsmen, the vast majority of them Germans, decided that the ban
Jewish settlement also includes this area. Reluctant to Jews the attitude of Łódź weavers and craftsmen decided that the first Jewish inhabitant of Nowe Miasto was only left at the end of 1833, Ludwik Mamroth, a wealthy merchant and component of Kalisz, which received permission from the government authorities to establish a yarn warehouse here. The next Jewish entrepreneurs who in the period until 1848 that were allowed to live in or set up a shop or yarn warehouse in Nowe Miasto were: Dawid Lande from Kalisz, Chaim Tykociner from Warsaw, Szmul Saltzman and Jakub Tyński. in total, until 1848, only 8 families lived there Jewish. The breakthrough came after the publication in September 1848 of the which definitely softened the limitations of the 1825 decree, between among others, it reduced by half the value of the property required from candidates wishing to live outside the district (previously PLN 20,000).

In 1836, the Jews began to take an active part in the city's economy. In addition, this year educated Jews came to the city who fought for the dismantling of the ghetto and managed to live in the other part of the city as individuals in various tricks. In 1840 the authorities realized that the boundaries of the Jewish Quarter should be expanded as the number of Jewish residents in the city reached over 1350, but this plan was not approved. The Jews turned to the Russian commissioner and asked for official approval for "retrospective rights", the approval was given after 20 years when there were already about 5,500 Jews in the city. Despite the approval and expansion of the neighborhood, the place was still crowded and the municipality did not allow more Jews to settle in the city, expelling Jews who were not permanent.

The end and the various restrictions on the Jews were in 1862 with the advent of the reform initiated by Prince Wielopowski, the liberal constitution - the emancipation of all the inhabitants of Poland and then the ghetto was also abolished and the Jews were released from the Treaty of Ziegler and the German Custodian. At the beginning of the reform, the Poles and Germans boycotted Jews who rented houses and evicted them from the common well, but later realized that cooperation with the Jews was economically viable for them. The Jews lived mainly in the center of Lodz, where there was also a Jewish character. The Jews who lived far from the center of Lodz were more involved with the Germans and Poles. After the ghetto was abolished, there was a great change among the Jews. The old wooden houses have disappeared and magnificent stone houses have been erected in their place. In addition the educated and merchants moved to more distant streets and established a branch trade. During this period there were wars between the old and the new between the educated and the Hasidim. In 1870 there were about 10,000 Jews in Lodz and in 1897 there were about 98,000 Jews. In 1809 the first synagogue was established and in 1811 land was purchased for the Jewish cemetery and thus the Jewish community of the city became an independent community independent of the communities around it. The Jews contributed greatly to the city's economy.

First world war
World War I caused a drastic decline in the number of Jews in Lodz, even before the Germans occupied the city. From the outbreak of World War I until the conquest of the city on December 6, 1914, about 50,000 Jews left the city. Their number dropped from 200,000 Jews on the eve of the war to less than 150,000. The Jews who fled the city for fear of being occupied by the Germans flowed east or into the surrounding villages. With the outbreak of the war, industrial production greatly diminished. There was a stagnation in trade and the financial market. The employment of the workers, and the Jewish workers among them, fell sharply. To deal with the famine, morbidity and mortality that were a result of the war, the community initiated mutual aid operations. With the help of the JDC, productive and consumer cooperatives were established and the activities of charities were expanded.

Second Polish Republic
Between the two world wars, the Łódź community was active not only in the field of education but also in the broader field of culture and various ideological movements: books were published in Hebrew and Yiddish, mainly in the fields of rabbinic literature, commentary and Hasidism, but also poetry and prose files. The most famous Lodz poet was Itzhak Katzenelson, who lived in Lodz from 1896 to 1939 when he escaped the city. He founded the Habima Hebrew Theater in Lodz. In 1939, with the outbreak of World War II, he fled to Warsaw. He devoted himself to literary activity in the Warsaw ghetto and even led a dramatic troupe in the ghetto. In 1943 he was sent to the Vital detention camp in France, and from there to Auschwitz, where he was murdered. In addition, daily newspapers, weekly magazines and periodicals in Yiddish and Hebrew appeared in Lodz.

II World War and Holocaust

Lodz Ghetto

The ghetto was officially demarcated on February 8, 1940, and was the first to be built by the Nazis and the last to be destroyed. Its area was less than 4 square kilometers, most streets had no sewers. To speed up the transition to the Nazi ghetto, a pogrom was carried out on March 1, during which many Jews were killed, and on April 30 the ghetto was closed to 164,000 Jews. The inhabitants of the ghetto suffered from hunger, and soon the inhabitants were left without means of subsistence, which led to demonstrations and riots, the situation improved somewhat after the establishment of production plants for the needs of Germany. In August 1942, 91 ghetto factories employed about 78,000 workers. About 15,000 people were sent to labor camps, only a few returned, and for many years there were periods when Germans brought remnants from various communities to the ghetto, which increased Residents suffered from famine, overcrowding and sanitation that caused epidemics, typhus and tuberculosis, and Rumkowski created a network designed to meet the needs of the population between 1940 and 1942, headed 7 hospitals, five pharmacies, an education department with 47 schools, a food department, a welfare department, nursing homes, dormitories, courts, and prisons, etc. Jewish police maintained order in the ghetto, but handed over deportations and recruitment to forced labor and even confiscated Jewish property, some opposed to Rumkowski.

People's Republic of Poland

In the first years after World War II, when Warsaw had not yet been rebuilt from its ruins, Łódź actually served as the capital of Poland due to its central location in Poland and due to the fact that the city itself, compared to Warsaw, was not destroyed. Therefore, in 1945–1948, the Polish authorities and its central institutions were located in Łódź. For the same reason, the Jewish community in Łódź was extremely important in Poland, both quantitatively and organizationally and institutionally.

Because of this challenge, the Łódź Jewish Committee was established. His main role was to rehabilitate the Sh'erit ha-Pletah, including housing, clothing, food, work, medical assistance, assistance in finding relatives and family reunification. The main source of aid was the JDC, which resumed operations in Poland in September 1946, and the TAZ. The ORT organization also resumed its operations in Poland at about the same time. The magnitude of the Holocaust, and the large number of Jews who arrived in Lodz within a few months after the Holocaust, presented the committee with many difficult tasks. The committee also worked in the field of children, almost all of whom were orphans. The activities of the orphanage were renewed, and efforts were made to remove Jewish orphans hidden in them during the Holocaust. After the Kielce pogrom, nearly half of the Jews of Łódź left Poland. The remaining Jewish community began to recover: a theater, two schools and about 20 newspapers and magazines in Yiddish, Hebrew and Polish began to operate. In the years 1956–1957, more Jews left the city, moving to Israel as part of the Gomulka Aliyah. In 1969, following the 1968 anti-Jewish campaign, people of Jewish origin left Łódź again.

See also
History of Łódź
History of the Jews in Białystok
The Holocaust in Poland
Antisemitism in Poland
Kinder KZ
Jewish-Polish history (1989–present)
Rescue of Jews by Poles during the Holocaust

References

Jewish
Łódź
Łódź
 

he:קהילת יהודי לודז'
uk:Єврейська громада Лодзі